The 2011 European Youth Summer Olympic Festival was held in Trabzon, Turkey, between 23 and 29 July 2011.

Sports
There were nine sports at the 2011 Festival, two branches, table tennis and water polo, less than compared with the 2007 Youth Olympic Festival's programme. Medals were awarded in a total of 109 events.

Venues
For the 2011 European Youth Summer Olympic Festival's eight events except cycling, eleven sports venues were needed in and around Trabzon. Existing sport halls were renovated and new arenas were built for this purpose with a total investment cost mounting up to TL 350 million (approx. US$210 million), inclusive the construction of additional accommodation facilities at a cost of TL 90 million (approx. US$54 million) for the Olympic Village within the campus of the Black Sea Technical University. The noteworthy new structures are Hayri Gür Arena, Söğütlü Athletics Stadium, Mehmet Akif Ersoy Indoor Swimming Pool and Beşirli Tennis Courts. Cycling events were held on the Trabzon-Rize section of the Black Sea Coastal Highway.

Nations

Calendar

Medal table

References

External links

Official website

 
Sport in Trabzon
2011 in Turkish sport
2011 in multi-sport events
2011 in European sport
Youth sport in Turkey
European Youth Summer Olympic Festival
Multi-sport events in Turkey
2011 in youth sport
European Youth